The Lonely Lady of Grosvenor Square is a 1922 British silent romance film directed by Sinclair Hill and starring Betty Faire, Jack Hobbs and Eileen Magrath.

Cast
 Betty Faire - Jeanne Marney 
 Jack Hobbs - Duke of Monaghan 
 Eileen Magrath - Cissie 
 Dorothy Fane - Anne-Marie Marney 
 Arthur Pusey - Louis Marney 
 Gertrude Sterroll - Miss Marney 
 Ralph Forster - Butler 
 Mrs. Hubert Willis - Dunham 
 Daisy Campbell - Duchess 
 Emily Nichol - Mrs. Wheeler

References

External links
 

1922 films
British silent feature films
Films directed by Sinclair Hill
1920s romance films
British black-and-white films
British romance films
1920s English-language films
1920s British films